The 2022 FIBA U18 Women's European Championship Division C was the 15th edition of the Division C of the FIBA U18 Women's European Championship, the third tier of the European women's under-18 basketball championship. It was played from 26 to 31 July 2022 in Andorra la Vella, Andorra. Georgia won the tournament with Salome Svani being named the most valuable player.

Participating teams
  (23rd place, 2019 FIBA U18 Women's European Championship Division B)

First round
The draw of the first round was held on 15 February 2022 in Freising, Germany.

In the first round, the teams were drawn into two groups of three. All teams advance to the playoffs. The winners of both groups advance directly to the semifinals; the other teams will play the quarterfinals.

Group A

Group B

Playoffs

Quarterfinals

Semifinals

5th place match

3rd place match

Final

Final standings

References

2022
2022–23 in European women's basketball
FIBA U18
FIBA
Sports competitions in Andorra la Vella